Abū Yahya Zakariya al-Musta'sim bi'llah, (died 1389) was the eighth Abbasid caliph of Cairo under the tutelage of the Mamluk Sultanate. He served twice: first in 1377, then again in 1386–1389.

Al-Musta'sim was the son of al-Wathiq I (the fourth Caliph of Cairo). His given name was Zakariya and his Kunya was Abu Yahya. He was first installed in the office in 1377 for a short period of time, after al-Mutawakkil I was deposed. Al-Musta'sim was also deposed by Mamluk sultan and al-Mutawakkil I was again installed as caliph of Cairo by Mamluks. 

After few years, in 1386 al-Musta'sim was again installed as caliph of Cairo for the Mamluk Sultanate. He remained in the office from 1386 to 1389 and he was again succeeded by al-Mutawakkil I in 1389.

Bibliography

1389 deaths
Cairo-era Abbasid caliphs
14th-century Abbasid caliphs
Year of birth unknown
Sons of Abbasid caliphs